Oberkochen is a municipality (officially a town, despite its size) in the Ostalbkreis, in Baden-Württemberg, in Germany, central Europe.

Name
The name "Oberkochen"  consists of the two German words "ober", meaning "above" or "upper", and "Kocher", the name of the local river. The name indicates, that this settlement lies above the river Kocher or on its upper part. The river Kocher has its spring just to the south of Oberkochen and runs to the north. Therefore, the village next to the north of Oberkochen is Unterkochen, with the German "unter" meaning "lower" or "under".

Geography
Oberkochen is located in and above the valleys of the rivers Kocher and Langertbach between the area of Albuch in the west and north and the area of Härtsfeld in the east. The highest point in the area of Oberkochen is the top of the Volkmarsberg mountain (743 m above sea level). Directly south of the city the river Kocher has its origin.

The city consists of two main parts: the downtown area with the city center, Spitztal, Lenzhalde and Brunnenhalde and the Heide area, which lies 100 m above the city on a hill to the northeast.

History

Timeline

Schultheiß and mayors of Oberkochen
From 1553 until Feb 25th 1803 Oberkochen had two Schultheißen, one of the catholic Ellwangen and one of the Protestant würtembergian Königsbronn. Since 1933 Oberkochen has a mayor, who wears a livery collar since Oberkochen became a city in 1968. The collar was donated by trade, commerce, industry and liberal professions.

Population
During the Thirty Years' War (1618–1648) the population of Oberkochen was reduced from c. 500 to c. 100 inhabitants. It took nearly 200 years to reach a population of 500 again. In the 19th century the population saw a greater rise due to the industrialisation.

The next remarkable growth took place after World War II, when the population quadrupled from 2,000 to 8,000 people in just 20 years. One of the main reasons for this growth was the relocation and expansion of the company Carl Zeiss. In 1968 Oberkochen became officially a city, which is remarkable, because at this time a population of 10,000 people was a condition for towns in Germany to become a city. The reason for the premature change in the status of Oberkochen was the intense growth of the population prior to 1968, which made the mayor Gustav Bosch, as well as the responsible authorities believe, that a population of 10,000 would be reached soon. Therefore, the change of the status of Oberkochen from town to city was applied for and finally granted. Despite these expectations and actions the population stalled instead and even saw a slight decrease.

Today, there are more commuters working in Oberkochen than working people living there.

Coat of arms

The blazon of the coat of arms spells: "In blue three (2:1) golden roses." (German: "In Blau drei (2:1) goldene Rosen.")

The coat of arms was introduced in 1968 and is based on the one of the "Görig von Kochen" from 1404. He owned several pieces of land in Oberkochen. The colours were chosen without historic meaning.

Infrastructure

Transport
Oberkochen can be reached by using the Bundesstraße 19 ("B 19"), which runs along the Kocher-Brenz-Valley from north to south. Oberkochen has two junctions to the Bundesstraße, Oberkochen-North ("Oberkochen-Nord") and Oberkochen-South ("Oberkochen-Süd"). The nearest Autobahn is the Bundesautobahn 7 with the Aalen-Oberkochen-junction, which is reached via the B19 and L1084 after an 11 km drive from Oberkochen.

Oberkochen has no traffic lights. The traffic is mainly reglemented by the priority to the right rule, roundabouts and crosswalks.

By train Oberkochen is connected through the Brenz Railway, which is used by the Regional-Express of the DB Regio company. The nearest connection to national and international train services is made via the Aalen railroad station, which is 10 km away from Oberkochen  and has a direct link to it. The railroad station of Oberkochen has two platforms and is friendly for disabled persons, i.e. people using wheelchairs, through an elevator. It is possible to buy tickets for the train on a ticket machine located on the platforms.

Oberkochen does not have an own airport. The nearest airport with regular national transportation is the Stuttgart Airport (IATA: STR, ICAO: EDDS) which is a 90 km drive by car away from Oberkochen.

Education
Oberkochen has three municipal and one Roman Catholic kindergarten. There is a Gemeinschaftsschule, the Dreißentalschule, which contains a primary school and a secondary school, where a Mittlere Reife can be awarded. There is a Förderschule, the Sonnenbergschule also. The local Gymnasium is the Ernst-Abbe-Gymnasium, named after the scientist Ernst Abbe. There also is a Musikschule (music school). Oberkochen has no university and the next university can be found in Aalen.

The local folk high school is located in the building of the city hall. For a wider set of courses there is also a folk high school in Aalen. The municipal library was installed in the old Protestant church. It contains 19.000 media volumes and faces over 40.000 check outs per year.

Sacred buildings
The St.-Peter-und-Paul-Kirche (German for: St. Peter and Paul Church) is the local Roman Catholic church and was consecrated October 25, 1900. This church was the replacement for an older church from the Baroque period.

The local Protestant church is the Versöhnungskirche (German for: Reconciliation Church), which was consecrated in 1968. The predecessor of this church became the local library.

Despite the growing Muslim community there is no mosque in Oberkochen. The nearest mosque can be found in Aalen.

Economy
After World War II, the Allied troops moved parts of the Carl Zeiss Company in Jena to Oberkochen. Today, the headquarters of the Carl Zeiss AG are located in Oberkochen. Another important business is the Leitz company, which is the world-leading manufacturer for wood-processing tools.

International relations

Oberkochen is twinned with:

  Dives-sur-Mer, France, since 1984
  Montebelluna, Italy, since 1992
  Mátészalka, Hungary, since 2008

Honorary citizens

References

External links
 Official site 

Ostalbkreis
Württemberg